Quang Minh may refer to several places in Vietnam, including:

Quang Minh, Hanoi, a township of Mê Linh District
Quang Minh, Hà Giang, a commune of Bắc Quang District
Quang Minh, Hải Dương, a commune of Gia Lộc District
Quang Minh, Bắc Giang, a commune of Hiệp Hòa District
Quang Minh, Thái Bình, a commune of Kiến Xương District
Quang Minh, Sơn La, a commune of Vân Hồ District
Quang Minh, Yên Bái, a commune of Văn Yên District

See also
Quảng Minh (disambiguation)